Umid Samadov (born 7 October 2003) is an Azerbaijani footballer who plays as a midfielder for Kapaz in the Azerbaijan Premier League.

Club career
On 1 September 2022, Samadov made his debut in the Azerbaijan Premier League for Kapaz match against Qarabağ.

References

External links
 

2003 births
Living people
Association football midfielders
Azerbaijani footballers
Azerbaijan Premier League players
Kapaz PFK players